Arthur Arrowsmith (1880–1954) was an English footballer who played in the Football League for Stoke and Wolverhampton Wanderers.

Career
Arrowsmith was born in Wolverhampton and played for Compton and Coventry City before joining Stoke in 1906. He was a regular in the side in 1906–07 as he scored eight goals in 37 appearances but it was a terrible season for Stoke as they were relegation from the First Division for the first time. He remained with the club in the Second Division but was sold to Wolverhampton Wanderers in January 1908. He failed to make the grade at Wolves and left for non-league Willenhall Swifts.

Career statistics

References

19th-century births
1954 deaths
Footballers from Wolverhampton
English footballers
Association football inside forwards
Coventry City F.C. players
Stoke City F.C. players
Wolverhampton Wanderers F.C. players
Willenhall F.C. players
English Football League players